Bethesda Presbyterian Church is a historic Presbyterian church located on NC 5 in Aberdeen, Moore County, North Carolina.  It was built in 1860, and is a two-story, vernacular frame meeting house. It rests on tall granite piers, is sheathed in weatherboard, and has a hipped roof. The front facade features a projecting two-stage bell tower. Also on the property is a contributing church cemetery.

It was added to the National Register of Historic Places in 1979.

References

Presbyterian churches in North Carolina
Churches on the National Register of Historic Places in North Carolina
Churches completed in 1860
19th-century Presbyterian church buildings in the United States
Buildings and structures in Moore County, North Carolina
National Register of Historic Places in Moore County, North Carolina